The Church of the Good Shepherd built in 1880 is an historic Episcopal church located at 331 Lake Avenue in Maitland, Orange County, Florida. Designed by renowned New York architect Charles C. Haight in the Carpenter Gothic style of architecture, it was built largely through the efforts of the Right Reverend Henry Benjamin Whipple, the first bishop of Minnesota, who began wintering in Maitland in the 1870s. Its board and batten exterior walls and lancet windows are typical of Carpenter Gothic architecture, but its belfry centered over the altar area is unusual. The church was consecrated on March 17, 1883, and Bishop Whipple conducted regular services there each winter for the rest of his life. In 1967, a new modern church designed by Nils M. Schweizer was built to complement the original structure, which since then has served as a chapel. On March 28, 2011, the 1880 church was added to the National Register of Historic Places.

Current status
The Church of the Good Shepherd is an active parish in the Episcopal Diocese of Central Florida. The Priest in Charge is Rev. Karen Egerton.

See also

 Church of the Good Shepherd (disambiguation)

References

External links
  Church of the Good Shepherd website
  Newspaper Articles and Slideshow

National Register of Historic Places in Orange County, Florida
Churches on the National Register of Historic Places in Florida
Churches in Orange County, Florida
Episcopal church buildings in Florida
Carpenter Gothic church buildings in Florida
Maitland, Florida
1880 establishments in Florida